Batocera forbesii is a species of beetle in the family Cerambycidae. It was described by Waterhouse in 1881. It is known from Sumatra.

References

Batocerini
Beetles described in 1881